Christian Javan Lio-Willie (born 26 August 1998) is a New Zealand rugby union player who plays for  in the National Provincial Championship (NPC). His playing position is loose forward.

Early life
Lio-Willie attended Massey High School in Auckland. Aged 18, he moved to Dunedin to attend the University of Otago. He has played club rugby for Kaikorai RFC in Dunedin.

Rugby career
Lio-Willie joined the Otago wider training squad in 2020; however, he would not make an appearance that season.

In 2021 Lio-Willie made his debut for Otago in a 26-19 win against to Southland on 7 August where he made a rampaging break in the 78th minute that set up the winning try of the match. On 15 October he played 42 minutes in a 24–13 win against Northland.

Personal life
As of 2021, Lio-Willie is in his fifth year studying dentistry at the University of Otago. He is of Samoan descent.

Reference list

External links
 

Living people
1998 births
New Zealand rugby union players
Rugby union number eights
Otago rugby union players
People educated at Massey High School
Rugby union players from Auckland
University of Otago alumni
Rugby union flankers
Highlanders (rugby union) players
Crusaders (rugby union) players